Preachers of the Night is the fifth studio album by German power metal band Powerwolf. It was released on 19 July 2013. The band wrote it during 2012 and began recording it in December of the same year at the Studio Fredman in Gothenburg, Sweden.

The album was rated positively by the critics. The album also flourished commercially, ranked first in the German charts, and also ranked in several other countries.

Much like Blood of the Saints, Preachers of the Night includes in its deluxe version a bonus orchestral CD, titled The Sacrilege Symphony II.

The album's single "Amen & Attack" was released on 28 June 2013.

Background 
Powerwolf began writing their fifth album in 2012. They finished in the November of the same year.

They recorded their album in December 2012 at the Studio Fredman in Gothenburg, and the process lasted until March 2013. The album's cover art, created by the band's guitarist Matthew Greywolf, was unveiled on 2 May 2013.

On 11 July 2013, Napalm Records released audio samples of all the tracks from the album on their YouTube channel.

Critical reception 
Metal.de commented: "Powerwolf are once again damned in love with detail, the new album is full of majestic opulence and pomp, epic grandeur, sing-along choruses and a healthy dose of self-irony. Effective, resounding, rousing". Metal Hammer wrote: "To be honest: who occupies such a good, reliable and original drawer, must not be accused, in this to persist". The magazine pointed out that the new songs live among other things, because of their "unrestrained speed as extremely effective".

Track listing

Personnel 

Powerwolf
Attila Dorn – vocals
Matthew Greywolf – lead and rhythm guitar
Charles Greywolf – bass, rhythm guitar
Roel van Helden – drums, percussion
Falk Maria Schlegel – organ, keyboards

Additional musicians
Patrick Staub – vocals (choir)
Jörg Zimmer – vocals (choir)
Frank Beck – vocals (choir)
Philipp Allar – vocals (choir)
Andreas Schröder – vocals (choir)
Hans-Peter Kirsch – vocals (choir; bass)
Peter Kargerer – vocals (choir; bass)
Edgar Weiß – vocals (choir; bass)
Helen Vogt – vocals (choir; alto, soprano)
Annick Tabari – vocals (choir; alto, soprano)
Anne Diemer – vocals (choir; alto, soprano)
Christine Kruchten – vocals (choir; alto, soprano)
Simone Theobald – vocals (choir; alto, soprano)
Silvana Bergwanger – vocals (choir; alto, soprano)
Andrea Witting – vocals (choir; alto, soprano)
Almut Hellwig – vocals (choir; alto, soprano)

Technical personnel
Kai Stahlenberg – recording, engineer
Kristian Kohlmannslehner – recording, engineer
David Buballa – engineer, editing
Charles Greywolf – bass recording
Fredrik Nordström – mixer
Henrik Udd – mixer
Svante Forsbäck – mastering
Francesco Cottone – choir conductor

Other personnel
Manuela Meyer – photography
Matthew Greywolf – artwork, layout

Charts

References 

2013 albums
Powerwolf albums